Mushegh VI Mamikonian (died 25 April 775) was an Armenian noble of the Mamikonian family. He served as presiding prince of Arab-ruled Armenia in 748–753, and later participated in the Armenian rebellion of 774–775 against the Abbasid Caliphate, being killed in the Battle of Bagrevand.

775 deaths
8th-century kings of Armenia
8th-century Armenian people
Mushegh 06
Armenian rebels
Monarchs killed in action
Vassal rulers of the Abbasid Caliphate
Princes of Armenia